Symplococarpon is a genus of flowering plants belonging to the family Pentaphylacaceae.

Its native range is Mexico to Venezuela.

Species:

Symplococarpon flavifolium 
Symplococarpon purpusii

References

Pentaphylacaceae
Ericales genera